Liu Jiayi (born August 1956) is a Chinese politician. He is the former Chairman of the Standing Committee of Shandong People's Congress, Communist Party Secretary of Shandong, before that, Auditor General of the People's Republic of China.

Biography 
Born in Kai County, Sichuan (now part of Chongqing municipality), Liu graduated from Southwestern University of Finance and Economics. After college, he was assigned to work in the audit office of Sichuan Province. In 1988, he was promoted to a position in the Chengdu office of the National Audit Office. In the next few years Liu specialized in commercial audits.

In September 1996, after completing one-year training for young cadres at the Central Party School of the Chinese Communist Party, Liu was appointed to the post of deputy auditor general. Following the retirement of Li Jinhua, he was promoted to the office of Auditor General of the People's Republic of China in March 2008. He was conferred the Grand Decoration of Honor in Gold with Sash, a state honor of Austria, on May 25, 2016.

He was transferred to Shandong province to become party chief there in 2017.

On 23 October 2021, he was appointed vice chairperson of the National People's Congress Financial and Economic Affairs Committee. On October 25, he resigned as chairman of the Standing Committee of Shandong People's Congress.

He is a senior auditor and a member of the 17th, 18th, and 19th Central Committees of the Chinese Communist Party.

References 

Living people
1955 births
People's Republic of China politicians from Chongqing
Chinese Communist Party politicians from Chongqing
Southwestern University of Finance and Economics alumni
Members of the 17th Central Committee of the Chinese Communist Party
Members of the 18th Central Committee of the Chinese Communist Party
Members of the 19th Central Committee of the Chinese Communist Party
Delegates to the 13th National People's Congress